OCSiAl is a global nanotechnology company, the world's largest graphene nanotube manufacturer, conducting its operations worldwide. The OCSiAl headquarters are located in Luxembourg, with several offices in the United States, Europe and Asia.

The company has over 450 employees.

Nanotube synthesis technology 
OCSiAl owns the only scalable technology that can synthesize graphene nanotubes (also known as single wall carbon nanotubes – SWCNTs) in industrial volumes. The technology is notable for producing SWCNTs in large quantities (tonnes) to enable low enough pricing for industrial applications to become economically feasible.

The company's initial synthesis facility, named Graphetron 1.0, produced the first industrial-scale batch of graphene nanotubes – 1.2 tonnes – in 2015, which at the time exceeded the entire volume of this material ever produced since its discovery in 1991. In February 2020, OCSiAl announced the launch of its second synthesis facility, named Graphetron 50, which is currently the world’s largest plant for graphene nanotube production. OCSiAl's current production capacity is 90 tonnes per year. 

In 2022, OCSiAl was granted approval by the Luxembourg authorities for the construction of a production plant, together with an associated R&D center, in Differdange, Luxembourg. This synthesis facility is expected to be the largest of its kind and is scheduled to begin production in 2025.

History
In December 2014, Frost & Sullivan recognized the OCSiAl Group with its 2014 North American Award for Technology Innovation for OCSiAl's TUBALL SWCNT products. The award was given for the high purity and large-scale production capability of TUBALL products, which has significantly increased the commercialization potential of single wall carbon nanotube products.

In 2015, the National Nanotechnology Initiative (NNI), a United States government program to accelerate nanotechnology commercialization, recognized OCSiAl for expanding its matching grant program (iNanoComm) for exploratory research with SWCNT.

In September 2016, OCSiAl registered its core product TUBALL through the EU's Registration, Evaluation, Authorisation and Restriction of Chemicals (REACH) regulation under the number 01-2120130006-75-0000. As of November 2016, OCSiAl is the only company with the license to produce and commercialize up to 10 tonnes of nanotubes in Europe annually. In 2020, OCSiAl upgraded its dossier under the EU’s REACH legislation and expanded the volume authorized for commercialization in Europe up to 100 tonnes of TUBALL nanotubes annually.

In 2019, OCSiAl was added to the list of unicorn startup companies, a list of startup companies valued at $1 billion or more, according to CB Insights. In 2021, Daikin Industries announced its investment in OCSiAl "to globally accelerate application development of lithium ion battery materials for EV", by underwriting a capital increase through a third-party allocation of shares. In accordance with the terms of the agreement, the valuation of OCSiAl is circa $2 billion.

Products
The company's core product is TUBALL, high-purity graphene nanotubes that can be used as a universal additive for a wide range of materials. Graphene nanotube is an extremely thin rolled-up sheet of graphene. The key advantage of graphene nanotubes centers around the very low loadings, starting at 0.01%, that is sufficient for achieving uniform and permanent conductivity while also reinforcing mechanical properties. The very low loadings made possible by SWCNT provide the ability to maintain the original color and minimally impact the secondary properties of most materials.

OCSiAl has also developed nanotube-based concentrates that simplify graphene nanotubes use in various materials. In 2015, the company opened a research facility focused on nanotubes applications for batteries, elastomers, paints and coatings, thermoplastic, and thermoset materials.

OCSiAl nanotube applications

Elastomers
TUBALL-based masterbatches use rubber polymers, fillers and oil plasticizers as nanotube carriers, allowing performance improvements with minimal changes to the composition of a rubber compound. In October 2016, LANXESS and OCSiAl announced new nanotubes products targeting reinforced and conductive latex rubbers.

In 2022, OCSiAl announced a new product created as a result of co-development of a nanotube solution together with Daikin Industries to increase the durability and resistance to extreme conditions of fluoropolymer components.

Energy storage
Applied in lithium-ion battery anodes, TUBALL graphene nanotubes allow manufacturers to use fast-charging, energy-dense silicon, which has over nine times the energy density of traditionally-used graphite, in the mass production of lithium-ion battery cells. Previously, the use of silicon was limited by the problem of its expansion during charging and discharging, which led to battery degradation. OCSiAl’s nanotubes create long, flexible, conductive, strong bridges to keep silicon anode particles well connected to each other even during severe volume expansion and cracking. This leads to long-lasting, faster-charging high-performance batteries for electric vehicles.

In 2021, Daikin Industries became a shareholder of OCSiAl, and announced its intention to make progress on improving lithium-ion batteries, an extremely important element in electromobility.

TUBALL nanotubes bring performance improvements to Li-ion and lead–acid batteries, and to supercapacitors and fuel cells. In these applications SWCNT has the potential to replace carbon black and other carbon-based additives, with a study by Aleees demonstrating 10% higher volumetric energy density and decreasing cathode thickness by 18% in 10 Ah pouch cells. In another study by Aleees, SWCNT-coated foils showed an increase in energy delivered to cells by 0-252%, depending on the discharge rate. In trials of lead-acid batteries 0.001% of SWCNT in the electrode paste increased cycle life and rate capability five-fold.

Paints and coatings
TUBALL nanotubes provide conductivity to colored and transparent coatings with minimal impact on color or transparency, while maintaining or increasing mechanical properties. Conductivity may be employed for ESD-control properties or electrostatic painting methods.

In 2021, a leading Canadian producer in its field, Erie Powder Coatings has developed a variety of powder coatings for EMI and RFI applications using TUBALL graphene nanotubes from OCSiAl.

The same year, OCSiAl, BÜFA Composite Systems, and TIGER Coatings co-developed gelcoats enhanced with graphene nanotubes that impart conductivity to the gelcoat and make it receptive to powder coating.

Resins and composites 
In November 2016, OCSiAl announced an agreement with BÜFA Composite Systems in Europe to provide TUBALL nanotubes and TUBALL MATRIX nanotube concentrates for BÜFA-developed resin formulations. In 2017 BÜFA hit the market with its line of conductive gelcoats with colored, smooth and glossy surfaces. There are some particular applications where nanotube-based gelcoats can almost completely replace standard gelcoats. Pipes and tanks for chemicals, ventilation systems, printing rollers, control boxes for electronics, floor coatings at industrial production plants, tooling gelcoats and resins for composites, to name just a few. The companies noted that using graphene nanotubes in composites provides a conductive and reinforcing network at low loadings, enabling conductive parts to retain color and improve mechanical strength.

Thermoplastics 
At the start of 2022, OCSiAl launched a new TUBALL MATRIX 822 graphene nanotube concentrate specifically designed for PA, filled PPS, ABS, TPU, and PC compounds for injection moulding. The new nanotube product enables in-line e-painting of plastic exterior parts together with metal components using electrophoresis, where previously, separate production lines were required.

References

External links
OCSiAl website
TUBALL nanotubes website

Nanotechnology companies